Roland Richard Guaves Müller (born 2 March 1988) is a Filipino professional footballer who last plays as a goalkeeper for Amical Saint-Prex in the 2. Liga Interregional. Müller formerly played for the Philippines national team, earning 22 caps before his international retirement in 2017.

Club career

Early career in Germany 
Müller started at his hometown club, Köln, where he went through the ranks and eventually played their reserve team in the lower leagues.  He made a total of 64 appearances for them in three seasons, and never made any first team appearances.  His contract expired in the summer of 2010 and he then signed for 2. Bundesliga side Duisburg. He made his first league appearance on 25 November 2012 vs St. Pauli due to an injury to regular first choice shot-stopper Felix Wiedwald. He was not able to answer his international duties with the Philippines for the 2012 AFF Suzuki Cup.

Switzerland stint 
On 16 July 2013, he joined Swiss club Servette FC, signing a one-year deal with an option for two more years.

Sometime in 2016, Müller was loaned to Étoile Carouge of the Swiss league, 1. Liga Promotion. On June 11, 2016, Ceres F.C. of the United Football League announced that Muller will be joining the club. He is set to be included in the squad during the transfer window from July 18–31 at the end of the first round of the double-round robin league. His contract with Étoile Carouge was scheduled to be terminated by the end of June.

Ceres-Negros in the Philippines 
Ceres F.C. which then plays in the United Football League signed Müller mid-season of the 2016 edition of the league after the goalkeeper had stint with Etoile Carouge on loan.

He remained with Ceres when it joined the Philippines Football League, as Ceres-Negros F.C. in 2017. However he announced he took a leave from Ceres-Negros on December 21, 2017, after helping the club win the league title and revealed that he has earlier informed his club as early as June that he would be leaving the club after the inaugural season ended. He stated through social media that he made the decision to give more attention to his pregnant wife. He returned to club duty in July 2018.

International career
Towards the end of August 2011, Müller went to the Philippines and joined the national team's training ahead of the 2011 Long Teng Cup. He was eventually named in the final 20-man squad for the tournament and the provisional Philippines under-23 squad for the 2011 Southeast Asian Games. He made his debut for the Philippine U23 national team at the Southeast Asia-wide regional games and later for the senior squad at the 2011 Long Teng Cup.

In 2013, he was included in the Philippines squad for the 2014 AFC Challenge Cup qualification campaign. In both matches he was chosen to start ahead of Neil Etheridge and did not concede a single goal, helping the Philippines to qualify for the 2014 AFC Challenge Cup.

On March 22, 2017, he announced his retirement from the Philippine national team to spend more time with his family. He made 22 international caps for the Philippines often serving as an alternate goalkeeper to Neil Etheridge. He was originally listed in the 23-man Philippine squad which was set to play a friendly against Malaysia the following the day, which was the national team's first full international match in 2017.

Coaching career

Philippines
In March 2023, it was reported that Müller was appointed as the new goalkeeper coach of Philippines national team.

References

External links

1988 births
Living people
Citizens of the Philippines through descent
German sportspeople of Filipino descent
German footballers
Filipino footballers
Filipino expatriate footballers
Philippines international footballers
Association football goalkeepers
1. FC Köln II players
MSV Duisburg players
Servette FC players
2. Bundesliga players
Expatriate footballers in Switzerland
Footballers from Cologne